Vasyukovo is a rural locality (a village) in Yagnitskoye Rural Settlement, Cherepovetsky District, Vologda Oblast, Russia. The population was 21 as of 2002.

Geography 
Vasyukovo is located 107 km south of Cherepovets (the district's administrative centre) by road. Bolshoy Dvor is the nearest rural locality.

References 

Rural localities in Cherepovetsky District